Ego Tripping may refer to:

 Ego Trippin', a 2008 album by Snoop Dogg
 Ego Tripping at the Gates of Hell, a 2003 album by The Flaming Lips
 "Ego Trippin'", a 1986 song by Ultramagnetic MCs
 "Ego Trippin'" (Part Two), a 1994 song by De La Soul from the album Buhloone Mindstate
 "Ego Tripping (there may be a reason why)", a 1973 poem by Nikki Giovanni

See also
 Egotrip (disambiguation)
 Ego Trip (disambiguation)